Giuseppe Soravia (23 January 1948 – 26 November 1980) was an Italian bobsledder. He competed in the two man event at the 1980 Winter Olympics.

References

1948 births
1980 deaths
Italian male bobsledders
Olympic bobsledders of Italy
Bobsledders at the 1980 Winter Olympics
Place of birth missing